Trifolium depauperatum is a species of clover known by the common names cowbag clover, poverty clover, and balloon sack clover.

Distribution
It is a common plant of many types of habitat, including coastal prairie and mixed evergreen forest.

Description 
Trifolium depauperatum is a small annual herb growing upright or decumbent in form. The leaves are made up of oval leaflets up to 2 centimeters long which are smooth, toothed, lobed, or blunt-tipped. The inflorescence is a head of flowers up to 1.5 centimeters long. The flower has a pinkish purple white-tipped corolla up to a centimeter long. It becomes inflated as the fruit developed.

Subspecies
Trifolium depauperatum has several varieties, which can include:
Trifolium depauperatum var. amplectens — Balloon sack clover,  Pale bladder clover.
Trifolium depauperatum var. depauperatum — Cowbag clover.
Trifolium depauperatum var. hydrophilum
Trifolium depauperatum var. truncatum — Dwarf sack clover.

References

External links
  Calflora Database: Trifolium depauperatum (Cowbag clover, Dwarf sack clover, Pale sack clover)
Jepson Manual eFlora (TJM2) treatment of Trifolium depauperatum

 UC CalPhotos gallery: Trifolium depauperatum

depauperatum
Flora of California
Flora of Baja California
Flora of British Columbia
Flora of Chile
Flora of Oregon
Flora of Peru
Flora of the Sierra Nevada (United States)
Natural history of the California chaparral and woodlands
Natural history of the California Coast Ranges
Natural history of the Central Valley (California)
Natural history of the Channel Islands of California
Flora without expected TNC conservation status